Val Schierling (born January 31, 1946) is an American former college women's basketball coach. He coached at Emporia State University from 1981 to 1995. Before coaching at his alma mater, Schierling coached the Chaparral High School girls' basketball team for seven years.

Career

Playing career
Schierling attended Emporia State from 1964–68, competing on the school's track and field team. During his career at Emporia State, Schierling won four Central Intercollegiate Athletic Conference hurdle championships, and set several school records. Schierling was also an NAIA All-American in both 1967 and 1968. Schierling is a member of Emporia State's Athletic Hall of Fame. He won the 400-meter hurdles race at the Canadian Track and Field Championships in 1968.

Coaching career
In his fourteen seasons at helm of the Lady Hornets program, Schierling had won two Central States Intercollegiate Conference regular season and tournaments and combined a record of 212–189 overall and a 23–41 record in the MIAA. While head coach at Emporia State, the school transitioned from a National Association of Intercollegiate Athletics school to a National Collegiate Athletic Association school. Schierling was also the winningest coach in Emporia State's history up until the 2006–07 season, when Brandon Schneider passed Schierling. In 1995, after four consecutive losing seasons, Schierling was fired.

|- style="background: #231F20; color:white"
| colspan="6" style="text-align:center;"| NCAA Independent

|-
| colspan="6" style="text-align:center; "|

References

1946 births
Living people
People from Sedan, Kansas
Basketball coaches from Kansas
Track and field athletes from Kansas
American male hurdlers
American women's basketball coaches
Emporia State Lady Hornets basketball coaches
Emporia State University alumni
Canadian Track and Field Championships winners